Bermuda Athletic Association Wanderers Football Club is a Bermudian association football team.

References

Football clubs in Bermuda